Shaftoe Crags Settlement is an archaeological site in Northumberland, England, about  west of Morpeth. The site at Shaftoe Crags, with remains dating from the Iron Age and Romano-British periods, is a scheduled monument.

Background
In Cumbria and Northumberland, native settlements regarded as dating from the Roman period have been found: such a site typically has one or more stone roundhouses at the back of an enclosure, opposite a single entrance, with small enclosed yards within the enclosure.

An earlier type of defended settlement began to be constructed during the 7th to 5th centuries BC, in the northern uplands of what is now England, sometimes located on hilltops. Within the enclosure there would be a number of stone or timber roundhouses for the inhabitants, probably a single family group, and perhaps space to keep livestock in winter.

Description
This is a native defended settlement of the Roman period.

There are indications of an enclosing rampart of an earlier Iron Age settlement, within which the Romano-British settlement was built. Any roundhouses from this period are obscured by the later buildings.

Archaeological sites nearby
 Huckhoe Settlement, an Iron Age and Romano-British defended settlement 
 The Poind and his Man, a Bronze Age burial mound
 Slate Hill Settlement, an Iron Age defended settlement

References

Scheduled monuments in Northumberland
Archaeological sites in Northumberland